The Women's Scratch was one of the six women's events at the 2003 UCI Track Cycling World Championships, held in Stuttgart, Germany.

Twenty cyclists from twenty countries were due to participate in the race, Victoria Pendleton of Great Britain did not start. Because of the number of entries, there were no qualification rounds for this discipline, only the final race.

Final
The final and only race was run at 14:00 on August 2. The competition consisted on 40 laps, making a total of 10 km.

References

Women's scratch
UCI Track Cycling World Championships – Women's scratch
UCI